Evanger Church is a parish church of the Church of Norway in Voss Municipality in Vestland county, Norway. It is located in the village of Evanger. It is the church for the Evanger og Bolstad parish which is part of the Hardanger og Voss prosti (deanery) in the Diocese of Bjørgvin. The white, wooden church was built in a long church design in 1851 using plans drawn up by the architect Hans Linstow. The church seats about 250 people.

History
There has been a church at Evanger since the middle ages. It was first recorded in historical records in 1315, but the church was not built that year. The first church was a wooden stave church that was likely built during the 13th century. The old church was torn down in the 1600s and replaced by a new timber-framed long church on the same site. It had a rectangular  nave and a square  choir with a tower on the west end. In 1673, a new tower was constructed. During the late-1600s, church records show a flurry of construction activity including a new roof, ceiling, and second floor seating gallery in addition to new interior and exterior painting. In 1702–1704, the old tower was torn down and a brand new tower built in its place. The church had a  nave with a  choir on the east end. Johan Christian Dahl included Evanger Church in one of his paintings in 1831 (the only known image of that church that is still in existence, however, the image does not really match written descriptions of the building).

In 1851, the old church was torn down and replaced with a new church on the same site, reusing the one of the foundation walls from the previous church. This new church was built using designs drawn by Hans Linstow and the lead builder was Ole Syslak. A small sacristy is located to the east of the choir. The church is decorated in the Empire style. During the 1950s, the church porch was rebuilt and enlarged.

Media gallery

See also
List of churches in Bjørgvin

References

Voss
Churches in Vestland
Long churches in Norway
Wooden churches in Norway
19th-century Church of Norway church buildings
Churches completed in 1851
13th-century establishments in Norway